Oscar Machado Zuloaga International Airport  is a general aviation airport in the Miranda state of Venezuela, serving Caracas, the capital of Venezuela. The airport is named in honor of Oscar Machado Zuloaga, an engineer and civic developer.

Low mountain terrain lies to the north, between the airport and Caracas.

The airport has an ILS approach to Runway 10.

Facilities
Customs and Immigration are available. The airport has full services, fuel, maintenance, weather, aircraft/avionics repair shops,  snack bar, pilots briefing room and two flight schools.

See also
Transport in Venezuela
List of airports in Venezuela

References

External links
OpenStreetMap - Oscar Machado Zuloaga
OurAirports - Oscar Machado Zuloaga
SkyVector - Oscar Machado Zuloaga

Airports in Venezuela
Miranda (state)